Jerry Welborn (born January 7, 1932) is an American sprint canoer who competed in the early 1970s. At the 1972 Summer Olympics in Munich, he was eliminated in the repechages of the K-4 1000 m event.

References

1932 births
American male canoeists
Canoeists at the 1972 Summer Olympics
Living people
Olympic canoeists of the United States